Ramlal is Pracharak (full-time worker) of Rashtriya Swyamsewak Sangh.

He was BJP’s General Secretary (Organisation) for 13 years and was the longest-serving General Secretary of the party.

He was known for his organisational skills and coordination within BJP and their allied Organisations. He gave the slogan “Booth Jeeta-Chunav jeeta” to BJP’s Karyakartas (workers) for strengthening their booth level.He visited Kerala in 2022.

Ramlal has been active in the Sangh since the emergency days. He was also jailed for more than 8 months during that period. He leaves a significant mark in the Bharatiya Janata Party’s history. During his term, the BJP recorded stunning victories in two General Elections and several Assembly polls. In July 2019, he returned to Rashtriya Swaymsevak Sangh as ‘Akhil Bhartiya Sampark Pramukh’.

References

Activists from Uttar Pradesh
Living people
Rashtriya Swayamsevak Sangh pracharaks
1957 births
Bharatiya Janata Party politicians from Uttar Pradesh
People from Mathura